Robert Carlsson (born September 29, 1977) is a Swedish professional ice hockey player. He is currently with the Södertälje SK team in the Swedish HockeyAllsvenskan league.

With the exception of an 18-game loan to Nyköpings Hockey in 1998 and the 2011-12 season played with the Malmö Redhawks, Carlsson has spent his entire career with Södertälje SK, including 463 regular season games played in the Swedish Elitserien.

Career statistics

References

External links 
 

1977 births
Living people
Frederikshavn White Hawks players
JYP Jyväskylä players
Malmö Redhawks players
Nyköpings Hockey players
Södertälje SK players
Swedish ice hockey left wingers
People from Södertälje
Sportspeople from Stockholm County